Brooklyn August is a poem by Stephen King that first appeared in 1971 in Io magazine and was later collected in King's Nightmares & Dreamscapes in 1993. It also pairs with another story in that collection, "Head Down."

Synopsis
The poem is reflective in tone, a nostalgic look back at what many consider to be the glory days of baseball as America's national pastime, focusing on the heyday of the Los Angeles Dodgers in their days as the Brooklyn Dodgers under the management of Walter Alston. The poems title reflects the tone of the poem, as it describes the team's 1956 heyday at their Ebbets Field ground, now long since demolished. The poem mentions many of the players associated with the club, celebrating their accomplishments and ends on a wistful note, that the writer can still see it if he closes his eyes, again bringing in the main theme of the poem, of a golden age past.

See also
 Stephen King short fiction bibliography

References 

Poetry by Stephen King
American poems